Thank You is the second major-label studio album by American singer-songwriter Meghan Trainor. The album was released exclusively on Apple Music on May 6, 2016, and worldwide on May 13, 2016, by Epic Records. Its songs were mostly co-written by Trainor, Jacob Kasher Hindlin and Eric Frederic, and produced by the latter. Artists who were featured on the album include Trainor's mother Kelli Trainor, LunchMoney Lewis, R. City and Yo Gotti. Musically, Thank You was inspired by Caribbean music, and attempted to showcase Trainor's love for Aretha Franklin, Bruno Mars and Elvis Presley. Primarily a pop record, Thank You also includes dance-pop and R&B.

The album was a commercial success, debuting at number three on the US Billboard 200 with sales of 107,000 album-equivalent units, of which 84,000 were pure album sales. It also peaked in the top five in Australia, Canada, New Zealand, Scotland and the United Kingdom. The album has since shipped over 1,000,000 in the US alone and has been certified platinum by the US recording industry United States (RIAA), the Canadian recording industry Canada (Music Canada), and the Australian recording industry Australia (ARIA)

The album was processed by three singles      "No", released as the album's lead single on March 4, 2016, reached number three on the US Billboard Hot 100. The second single from the album  "Me Too" was released on May 5, 2016, and peaked at number 13 on the Billboard Hot 100. "Better", featuring Yo Gotti, was released as the album's third single. Trainor promoted Thank You through a series of public appearances, televised live performances and The Untouchable Tour (2016).

Background and recording
In 2015, Meghan Trainor announced that she would be releasing her second album sometime in 2016, and confirmed some collaborations with a variety of artists and record producers, one of them was the Virgin Islands duo Rock City. Discussing her influences for the record, Trainor explained "I wanted to go big, I wanted to get all my influences in there and show everything from my Caribbean side to my love for Bruno Mars and Aretha Franklin and even some Elvis vibes, anyone I grew up listening to". In an interview with the Los Angeles Times, she stated that "it's definitely a Meghan Trainor album, but it's a more grown up, matured, intense Meghan Trainor".

In January 2016, in an interview with Forbes, Trainor confirmed that the first single from Thank You would be picked the week after, adding, "we're going to figure it out, and it's probably after all this stuff the craziness will start". The album was made available for pre-order on March 4, on the same day as the release of the lead single "No". The song caused the direction of the album to change, as Trainor and the producer Ricky Reed started experimenting with new musical styles and began producing six more tracks, replacing most of the original track list.

Composition
The album opens with "Watch Me Do", an upbeat, brass-heavy pop track where Trainor references a number of rap songs, and according to MTV News Sasha Geffen it contains "90s hip hop throwback vibes". "Me Too" is an electro song that focuses on gaining self-respect and confidence, with lyrics about "why we should all want to be like" Trainor. The third track and lead single, "No" is a dance-pop and R&B song that lyrically discusses men who approach women and "can't take the hint" when their advances are rejected. "Better", which features Yo Gotti, is a dancehall, reggae, and pop song with R&B influences. Its lyrics feature Trainor putting her ex-boyfriend on blast, and acknowledging that she deserves better, over a tropical beat. The fifth track, "Hopeless Romantic" is a "stripped-down ballad" on which, according to Patrick Ryan of USA Today, Trainor showcases her "charisma and dynamic vocals".

"I Love Me", featuring LunchMoney Lewis, features lyrics about confidence and self-importance over a "funky" baseline. The seventh track, "Kindly Calm Me Down" is a piano ballad. Describing it as "a rich, layered plea for a lover's soothing touch", Entertainment Weeklys Isabella Biedenharn called it "a rare quiet moment, showcasing her beautiful pipes". "Woman Up", a "militaristic, marching band-esque" song with lyrics commanding women to raise their hands if they "don't need a man", contains a sample of the Ashley Roberts song of the same name. "Just a Friend to You" focuses on Trainor's vocals, accompanied only by a ukulele. Its lyrics address "someone who refuses to acknowledge a romantic spark". The 10th track, "I Won't Let You Down" has a composition of synths and a "bouncy rhythm".

"Dance Like Yo Daddy" is a doo-wop-tinged song, in a lyrically similar vein as "Watch Me Do". "Champagne Problems" was compared to the work of Carly Rae Jepsen, and its lyrical message was noted as down to earth compared to other album tracks. "Mom", which only appears on the deluxe edition of the album, contains a recorded phone conversation between Trainor and her mother, Kelli Trainor. It includes "girl group backing vocals in addition to a full Motown-style horn section". "Friends" is a "choral sing-along" where Trainor affirms "I know we about to have a good time, 'cause I got all my friends with me'". The deluxe edition closes with the title track, on which Trainor collaborates with R. City.

Promotion
Trainor promoted Thank You with a series of public appearances and televised live performances. Trainor performed "No" live for the first time at the 3rd iHeartRadio Music Awards on April 3, 2016. She performed the track on The Graham Norton Show on April 8, 2016, on The Voice UK final on April 9, 2016, and on The Ellen DeGeneres Show on April 20, 2016. It was also performed at the 2016 Billboard Music Awards in May 2016. Trainor performed "Me Too" on The Tonight Show Starring Jimmy Fallon. She also performed it on Good Morning America with a live band and backup dancers. On June 21, 2016, Trainor performed "Me Too" on The Today Show. She also performed the song on Sunrise and Charts Center. Trainor has performed "Better" on The Tonight Show Starring Jimmy Fallon. The album's supporting concert tour, The Untouchable Tour, was announced on April 20, 2016; it consisted of 30 shows in North America, and one in Europe, with American band Common Kings and singer Hailee Steinfeld as its opening acts. The track "Mom" plays during the 2016 film Mother's Day.

Singles
"No" was released as the album's lead single on March 4, 2016 with the album's pre-order. The song debuted at number 11 on the US Billboard Hot 100, also marking the highest debut on the Radio Songs chart since Lady Gaga's "Born This Way" (2011). It peaked at number three in its fourth week on the Billboard Hot 100, staying at the position for two consecutive weeks. The song was certified double platinum in the United States for sales of over 2,000,000 units.

On May 5, 2016, "Me Too" was released as the second single from the album. It debuted at number 39 on the US Billboard Hot 100, and peaked at number 13 in its 11th chart week. It was certified triple platinum in the United States for sales in excess of 3,000,000 copies. It was also certified quadruple platinum in Australia and triple platinum in Canada, reaching number four on the former's singles chart.

Originally released as the third promotional single in April 2016, "Better", featuring Yo Gotti, was serviced to adult contemporary radio on August 29, 2016, as the third official single from the album. A solo version was sent to pop radio, while rhythmic radio was issued the original version featuring Gotti's vocals.

Promotional singles
"Watch Me Do" was released as the first promotional single from the album on March 25, 2016. "I Love Me", featuring LunchMoney Lewis, was released as the second promotional single from the album on April 15, 2016. MTV News noted the song "points out the importance of sticking up for yourself even when no one else will". "Better", featuring Gotti, was released as the third promotional single from the album on April 22, 2016. "Mom", featuring Kelli Trainor, was released as the fourth and final promotional single from the album on April 29, 2016.

Critical reception

Thank You received generally mixed reviews from critics. Stephen Thomas Erlewine of AllMusic stated that "it's a deliberately youthful sound in an era that yearns for maturity – but by working the same territory so carefully, the seams in her construction are difficult to ignore". Spins Dan Weiss called the album a "major step forward" from Trainor's debut. Writing for Newsday, Glenn Gamboa opined that it "shows how Trainor has become one of pop's most skilled young stars at crafting songs for her image, but there is still room to grow". Patrick Ryan of USA Today wrote that Thank You "tries to be a little bit of everything, and unfortunately doesn't amount to much. But it signals a promising future for the immensely talented Trainor". PopMatters Chris Conaton stated that it "is an interesting album in that it shows musical growth for Meghan Trainor while simultaneously moving her closer to the more homogenous sound of mainstream pop. It's not great by any means, but it is definitely catchy and easy to sing along with". Writing for Entertainment Weekly, Isabella Biedenharn wrote that Trainor "is as witty and funny as some of hip-hop's best rhyme-slayers", but added that the album's "attempts at getting personal [...] fall flat".

Allan Raible of ABC News  wrote that "Thank You isn't a terrible record. It has its moments. Trainor is still finding her groove", but added that it "shows her struggling with the pop world's cookie-cutter machine". Writing for Knoxville News Sentinel, Chuck Campbell stated "trouble is, she still hasn't arrived to 2016...Of course this wouldn't be the first time a 22-year-old hasn't yet figured out just who she is. So maybe her third release will give a clearer picture". The Observer was critical of Thank You, writing that it finds Trainor "ditching her All About That Bass doo-wop shtick in favour of 90s chart R&B. Unfortunately, the core problem remains – Trainor just isn't a convincing pop star. While the Britney-lite lead single No has its moments, most of the other songs are identity-free filler". Hazel Cills of MTV News wrote that the album "enters a league of pop and R&B that is brimming with exciting self-empowerment for women that makes Trainor's on-the-nose 'you want to be me' positioning feel dull", adding that "Thank You is a collection of trend-grabbing dresses whose seams will disintegrate by next year".

Commercial performance
In the United States, Thank You debuted at number three on the Billboard 200 issued for June 4, 2016, with 107,000 album-equivalent units during its first week, including 84,000 in pure sales. It dropped to number eight the week after, with 39,000 units. The third and fourth weeks resulted in Thank You dropping to number 12 and then rebounding to number 10 with 34,000 units to close out the top 10 that week. The album remained at number 10 in its fifth week, selling 27,000 units. In its seventh and eighth weeks on the chart it rose from number 16 back to number 10, selling 21,000 and 22,000 units, respectively.

Thank You debuted at number four on the Canadian Albums Chart. The album debuted at number three on the Australian Albums Chart issued for May 29. Thank You dropped to number four in its second week. It debuted at number five on the New Zealand Albums Chart on May 23, spending two consecutive weeks in the top 10. Among other markets, Thank You peaked at number five in Scotland and the United Kingdom, number seven in South Korea, number eight in Spain, and numbers fifteen and sixteen, in Ireland and Switzerland, respectively.

The RIAA certified it platinum in 2018. The album was certified platinum by Australian Recording Industry Association (ARIA), indicating sales in excess of 70,000. Music Canada also certified it platinum, indicating sales in excess of 80,000. As of December 2016, Thank You had sold over 282,872 copies in the United States.

Track listingNotes  signifies a vocal producer
  signifies a co-producer
  signifies an additional producerSample credits "Woman Up" contains a sample of Ashley Roberts' song of the same name (written by James G. Morales, Matthew Morales, Julio David Rodriguez, Nash Overstreet, Erika Nuri, and Shane Stevens)
 "Goosebumps" contains a portion of the composition "African Suspense" by The Young Divines (written by Robert Riley, Charles White, and Billy Ball)

 Personnel 
Personnel adapted from the album's liner notes.Recording locationsRecorded and engineered at Ricky Reed's studio (Elysian Park, Los Angeles, California), Vietom Studios (Sherman Oaks, Los Angeles, California), Hooked on Sonics (Memphis, Tennessee), MXM Studios (Los Angeles, California), Windmark Recording (Santa Monica, California), Vibeland Studios (New York City, New York), The Attic (Nashville, Tennessee), The Green Room (Nashville, Tennessee), The Carriage House (Nolensville, Tennessee), The Record Plant (Hollywood, California), Studio Willow-Valley (Gothenburg, Sweden), R8D Studios (North Hollywood, California)
Mixed at The Carriage House (Nolensville, Tennessee)
Mastered at Sterling Sound (New York City, New York)
Management – Atom Factory, a division of Coalition Media Group (Los Angeles, California)
Legal – Myman Greenspan Fineman/Fox Rosenberg & Light LLPPersonnel'

Meghan Trainor – vocals, background vocals, executive producer, programming, choir
Ricky Reed – executive producer, programming, bass (tracks 1–2, 6–7, 9), guitar (tracks 1–2, 4, 6, 8), keyboards (tracks 1–4, 6, 8, 10–11, 14), piano (tracks 3, 6, 10)
Tommy Brown – producer, programming, guitar (track 4), keyboards (tracks 4, 7)
Mr. Franks – producer, programming, guitar (track 4), keyboards (tracks 4, 14)
Johan Carlsson – producer, programming, acoustic guitar (tracks 5, 13), guitar (tracks 5, 13), background vocals, piano (track 13), synthesizer (track 13), tambourine (track 13)
Thomas Troelsen – producer, programming, background vocals, bass (track 6), tambourine (track 6)
The Elev3n – producer, programming
Chris Gelbuda – producer, background vocals, guitar (track 9)
Kevin Kadish – producer, programming, baritone saxophone (track 11), electric guitar (track 11), piano (track 11), tambourine (track 11)
Twice as Nice – producer, programming
The Monsters and the Strangerz – producer, programming
Tom Peyton – drums (tracks 1–2)
Chris Gehringer – mastering
Manny Marroquin – mixing (tracks 1–4, 6–12, 14)
John Hanes – mixing (tracks 5, 13)
Serban Ghenea – mixing (tracks 5, 13, 15)
Yo Gotti – vocals (track 4)
LunchMoney Lewis – vocals (track 6)
Kelli Trainor – vocals (track 13), choir
R. City – vocals (track 15)
James G. Morales – background vocals, drums (track 7–8), keyboards (track 8)
Matthew Morales – background vocals, strings (track 7), horn (track 8)
Julio David Rodriguez – background vocals, bass (tracks 7–8), guitar (track 7–8)
Jelli Dorman – background vocals
Taylor Parks – background vocals
Jennifer Hartswick – background vocals
Ross Golan – background vocals
Anita Marisa Boriboon – art director, design
Maya Krispin – styling
Lorien Meillon – hair
Alison Christian – make-up
Tom Schrimacher – photography

Charts

Weekly charts

Year-end charts

Certifications

Release history

References

External links 

2016 albums
Epic Records albums
Meghan Trainor albums
Albums produced by Chris Gelbuda
Albums produced by Kevin Kadish
Albums produced by Ricky Reed